HMS Caesar was one of thirty-two  destroyers built for the Royal Navy during the Second World War, a member of the eight-ship Ca sub-class. Commissioned in 1944, she was built as a flotilla leader with additional accommodation for staff officers. The ship was assigned to Home Fleet during 1944–1945 and escorted one Arctic convoy as well as the capital ships of the fleet.

Design and description
The Ca-class destroyer was a repeat of the preceding .

The ships were powered by a pair of geared steam turbines, each driving one propeller shaft using steam provided by two Admiralty three-drum boilers. As a flotilla leader, Caesars complement was 222 officers and ratings.

The main armament of the destroyers consisted of four QF  Mk IV dual-purpose guns, one superfiring pair each fore and aft of the superstructure protected by partial gun shields. Their anti-aircraft suite consisted of one twin-gun stabilised Mk IV "Hazemeyer" mount for  Bofors guns amidships and two twin and a pair of single mounts for six  Oerlikon AA guns. The ships were also fitted with two quadruple mounts amidships for 21-inch (533 mm) torpedo tubes. For anti-submarine work, they were equipped with a pair of depth charge rails and four throwers for 108 depth charges.

Construction and career
Caesar was laid down by John Brown & Company at their shipyard in Clydebank on 6 April 1943 with the name of Ranger and was launched on 14 February 1944 by which time she had been renamed. She was commissioned on 5 October and was allocated to the 6th Destroyer Flotilla for service with the Home Fleet. After a refit in mid-1945 to augment her anti-aircraft armament, she was transferred for service in the Far East in June, but joined the East Indies Fleet at Trincomalee, British Ceylon, in August.

Post war service
Following the war Caesar paid off into reserve. Along with other Ca group destroyers, she was selected for modernisation which was completed at Rosyth between 1957 and 1960. Work included a new enclosed bridge and Mark 6M gunnery fire control system, as well as the addition of two triple Squid anti-submarine mortars. She re-commissioned in September 1960 as leader of the 8th Destroyer Squadron with most of her service performed in the Far East.

Caesar was paid off in June 1965 and was de-equipped at Chatham. She was subsequently sold to Hughes Bolckow on 13 December 1966, arriving at their breaker's yard at Blyth, Northumberland, for scrapping on 6 January 1967.

References

Bibliography
 
 
 
 
 
 
 
 
 
 

 

World War II destroyers of the United Kingdom
Cold War destroyers of the United Kingdom
1944 ships
Ships built on the River Clyde
C-class destroyers (1943) of the Royal Navy